Kharamodun (Khara modon) is a rural locality (an ulus) in Kurumkansky District, Republic of Buryatia, Russia. The population was 73 as of 2010.

Geography 
Kharamodun is located 44 km southeast of Kurumkan (the district's administrative centre) by road. Argada is the nearest rural locality.

References 

Rural localities in Kurumkansky District